Rasharkin is a small village, townland and civil parish in County Antrim, Northern Ireland. It had a population of 1,114 people in the 2011 Census.

Folklore
Rasharkin features in Buile Shuibhne an old Irish tale about the Suibhne mac Colmain, king of the Dál nAraidi, driven insane by St. Ronan's curse. The tale is the final installment of a three-text cycle in medieval Irish literature, continuing on from Fled Dúin na nGéd (The Feast of Dun na nGéd) and Cath Maige Rátha (The Battle of Mag Rath).

King Sweeney's homeplace in the tale was Glenbuck that lies just outside Rasharkin. Seamus Heaney published an English version of the tale entitled Sweeney Astray

History
Historically Rasharkin was also spelt as Rosharkin and Rosarkin.

It lay within the barony of Kilconway that belonged to the MacDonnells in the 17th century.

Rasharkin also has a rich history and features in Ballymoney's involvement in the Irish Rebellion of 1798.

Presbyterians and Catholics in the area were active in the United Irishmen. An account of a member of the Rasharkin yeomanry in 1865 states that "at a meeting of sixty five persons held for the formation of a rebel club in Rasharkin, the first resolution moved and passed on the occasion commenced as follows :

"Seeing that the prophecies of Peyden and Rhymer and all the old prophecies are now fulfilling and that the days of tyranny are numbered in accordance therewith and that the time for independence and equality in Ireland is now arrived we do hereby unite."

The Troubles
A total of 3 people were killed in the village of Rasharkin during the period known as The Troubles. John McFadden, a member of the Royal Ulster Constabulary (RUC), and Robert Irvine, a member of the Royal Irish Regiment (RIR), were killed by the Irish Republican Army (IRA) on separate occasions. Gerard Casey was a member of the Irish Republican Army (IRA), and was killed by the Ulster Freedom Fighters (UFF).

Places of interest
Craigs Dolmen is situated three miles north of Rasharkin and is a passage tomb featuring a big capstone on seven upright stones.

People
Chris Baird, a football player for both Fulham F.C. and the Northern Ireland team is from the village.
Gerard Casey, IRA member killed by loyalists in 1989.
Karla Quinn a figure skater. She was crowned as British Junior Ice Skating Champion 2008, British junior silver medallist and the 2006 British junior bronze medalist. She is the first ever female Northern Irish skater to take three British titles at Novice, Primary and Junior levels.
Paddy McConnell, a footballer born in 1900, played for the all-island Irish National Football Team as well as a number of clubs including Southport and Shelbourne.
Daithi McKay, Former Sinn Féin Assembly Member for North Antrim (2007-2016). He secured the introduction of a carrier bag levy & rate relief for Amateur Sport Clubs during his tenure and later was a spokesperson for the campaign to secure Northern Ireland's first Climate Change Act.
Tom Ekin former Alliance Mayor of Belfast was raised in Rasharkin and went to school in the nearby townland of Ballymaconnelly.

Sport
The local Gaelic Athletic Association Club in Rasharkin is Naomh Mhuire (St. Mary's), and consists of hurling, camogie and Gaelic football teams.
Rasharkin United F.C. competed in the Ballymena & Provincial League until their disbandment in 2012 and were crowned league champions in 2005. The club was run by Mr. Peter Baird (chairman) and Chris Peacock (manager).

Demography

2011 Census
It had a population of 1,114 people (394 households) in the 2011 Census.
On Census day in 2011:
75.6% were from a Catholic background and 20.8% were from a Protestant background

2001 Census
Rasharkin is classified as a small village or hamlet by the NI Statistics and Research Agency (NISRA) (i.e. with population between 500 and 1,000 people). On Census day (29 April 2001) there were 864 people living in Rasharkin. Of these:
24.9% were aged under 16 years and 15.7% were aged 60 and over
48.4% of the population were male and 51.6% were female
73.5% were from a Catholic background and 26.0% were from a Protestant background
6.0% of people aged 16–74 were unemployed.
For more details see: NI Neighbourhood Information Service

Churches
There are 4 churches in the village ; Presbyterian, Church of Ireland, Roman Catholic and Free Presbyterian.

The oldest remaining building is in the churchyard of St. Andrew's Church of Ireland. Built c.1650 on the site of a medieval church, it is now in ruins.

The Free Presbyterian Church in Rasharkin was one of the first congregations of the new Free Presbyterian Church in 1951 after a damaging split in the Presbyterian Church locally with many opposed to the Minister there Rev Stronge.

See also 
List of towns and villages in Northern Ireland
List of civil parishes of County Antrim

References

External links
Culture Northern Ireland

Villages in County Antrim
Civil parishes of County Antrim